Angle Peak is a small but dominant peak that rises from one of the main spurs on the north side of Condor Peninsula in Antarctica. The feature stands close south of where Cline Glacier enters Odom Inlet, on the east coast of Palmer Land. It was mapped by the United States Geological Survey in 1974, and named by the Advisory Committee on Antarctic Names for J. Phillip Angle, of the Smithsonian Institution, who made bird life observations off the west coast of South America in 1965, and in Antarctic areas southward to Marguerite Bay, Antarctic Peninsula in 1966. He collaborated with George E. Watson in writing Birds of the Antarctic and Sub-Antarctic, 1975.

References
 

Mountains of Palmer Land